The Return of the Condor Heroes is a Hong Kong television series adapted from Louis Cha's novel of the same title. It was first broadcast on CTV in 1976 in Hong Kong.

Cast
 Note: Some of the characters' names are in Cantonese romanisation.

 Law Lok-lam as Yeung Kuo
 Tsui Ka-lam as young Yeung Kuo
 Lee Tong-ming as Siu-long-nui
 Jason Pai as Kwok Ching
 Michelle Yim as Wong Yung
 Lam Hau-yee as Kwok Fu
 Lam Yan-yan as Kwok Seung
 Cheung Man-ting as Lee Mok-sau
 Michael Chan as Wong Yeuk-see
 Chan Fei-lung as Hung Tsat-kung
 Yeung Chak-lam as Au-yeung Fung
 Chung Chi-keung as Yat-dang
 Chun Wong as Chow Pak-tung
 Cheng Lui as Kam-lun Fat-wong
 Ng Ming-choi as Tat-yee-ba
 Wu Yan-yan as Ching Ying
 Tam Yan-may as Luk Mo-seung
 Carol Cheng as Kung-suen Luk-ngok
 Bruce Leung as Ye-lut Chai
 Chan Yiu-lam as Wan Chi-ping
 Kenneth Tsang as Chiu Chi-king
 Cho Tat-wah as Kung-suen Chi
 Hon Kwok-choi as Kau Chin-chak, Granny Sun, Kau Chin-yan (Chi-yan)
 Mak Tin-yan as Yau Chui-kai
 Ba San as Wong Chui-yat
 Lau Kong as Ho Tai-tung
 Pau Hon-lam as Wong Chung-yeung
 Ding Ying as Lam Chiu-ying
 Chan Yuk-wai as Ye-lut Yin
 Lai See-man as Yuen-ngan Ping
 Paul Chun as Mou Sam-tung
 Ching See-chun as Mou Sau-man
 Wong Sik-kwong as Mou Duen-yu
 Fong Kit as Ye-lut Chor-choi
 Wan Chuen as Or Chun-ngok
 Fung Tsui-fan as Luk Lap-ting
 Cheung Hung-cheung as Luk Koon-ying
 Ho Siu-hung as Wan Hak-sai
 Chan Chi-leung as Siu-seung-tsi
 Lee Chuen-sing as Ma Kwong-tso
 Tong Kam-tong as Nai-mo-sing
 Stanley Fung as Luk Chin-yuen
 Bonnie Ngai as Ho Yuen-kwan, young Kau Chin-chak
 Yeung Hok-nin as Fung Mak-fung
 Tong Tik as Fan Yat-yung

External links

1970s Hong Kong television series
1976 Hong Kong television series debuts
1976 Hong Kong television series endings
Shaw Brothers Studio films
Hong Kong wuxia television series
Television shows based on The Return of the Condor Heroes
Television series set in the Southern Song
Television series set in the Mongol Empire
Hong Kong romance television series
Sequel television series
Television series about orphans
Cantonese-language television shows
1970s romance television series